Creocele cardinalis, the broad clingfish, is a species of clingfish found on the southern coast of Australia.

Description 
This species grows to a length of  TL. The colour is generally greenish with markings of darker brown.  The head has a distinctly flattened appearance.

References

External links 
 

Gobiesocidae
Monotypic fish genera
Fish of Australia
Taxa named by Edward Pierson Ramsay
Fish described in 1882